The Capt. Rodney J. Baxter House is an historic octagonal house at South and Pearl Streets in Barnstable, Massachusetts.  Built in 1850, it is Barnstable's only example of an octagon house, built closely to designs advocated by Orson S. Fowler and briefly popular in the 1850s.  It was listed on the National Register of Historic Places in 1987.

Description and history
The Baxter House stands one block off the downtown area of the village of Hyannis, on the south side of South Street at its junction with Pearl Street. The house is located on the west side of its lot, with the smaller carriage house to the east. Two of its eight sides have entrances: the one facing the street is a simpler entrance sheltered by a bracketed hood, while that facing east is sheltered by a single-story porch extending across that facade, with a spindled balustrade and turned posts. Most of the other facades have two windows on each level; some have only one. The interior of each level has a central square chamber, around which are four smaller rectangular chambers, with the remaining triangular spaces used as closets. The carriage house, one story in height has a similar exterior finish and a smaller footprint, and is topped by smaller octagonal cupola. A two-leaf vehicle entrance is topped by a half-round fan; both the fan and the doors have strap woodwork decoration.

The house was built about 1850 for Rodney J. Baxter, a sea captain engaged mainly in the transatlantic trade.  The house was built according to principles articulated by Orson Squire Fowler in The Octagon House, A Home for All, which formed the basis for the designs of numerous similar houses across the country.  The house closely follows Fowler's guidelines, including the use of concrete for the walls.  At the time of its listing on the National Register in 1987, it was still owned by Baxter's descendants.

See also
National Register of Historic Places listings in Barnstable, Massachusetts
List of octagon houses

References

External links
 MACRIS Listing - Capt. Rodney J. Baxter House

Octagon houses in Massachusetts
Houses in Barnstable, Massachusetts
National Register of Historic Places in Barnstable, Massachusetts
Houses on the National Register of Historic Places in Barnstable County, Massachusetts